Boronia gracilipes, commonly known as karri boronia, is a plant in the citrus family, Rutaceae and is endemic to the south-west of Western Australia. It is an erect, spindly shrub with compound leaves and pink, four-petalled flowers.

Description
The four sepals are triangular to almost round and overlap at their bases. The stigma is large and oval, almost without a style. Flowering occurs mainly from July to December.

Taxonomy and naming
Boronia gracilipes was first formally described in 1860 by Ferdinand von Mueller and the description was published in Fragmenta phytographiae Australiae. The specific epithet (gracilipes) is derived from the Latin words gracilis meaning "slender" and pes meaning "foot".

Distribution and habitat
Karri boronia grows in shady places in gullies and granite outcrops in the Esperance Plains, Jarrah Forest and Warren biogeographic regions of Western Australia.

Conservation
Boronia gracilipes is classified as "not threatened" by the Western Australian Government Department of Parks and Wildlife.

References

gracilipes
Flora of Western Australia
Plants described in 1860
Taxa named by Ferdinand von Mueller